The 1981–82 United Counties League season was the 75th in the history of the United Counties League, a football competition in England.

Premier Division

The Premier Division featured 17 clubs which competed in the division last season, along with two new clubs, promoted from Division One:
British Timken Duston
Stevenage Borough

League table

Division One

Division One featured 14 clubs which competed in the division last season, along with one new club, relegated from the Premier Division:
Northampton Spencer

League table

References

External links
 United Counties League

1981–82 in English football leagues
United Counties League seasons